A list of films (phim điện ảnh) produced in Vietnam.

1920s

1930s

1940s

1950s

1960s

1970s

1980s

1990s

2000s

2010s

See also
List of Vietnamese films of 2014

References

External links
 Vietnamese film at the Internet Movie Database

Lists of Vietnamese films